Malacolepadidae is a family of acorn barnacles in the order Scalpellomorpha. There are at least two genera and two described species in Malacolepadidae.

Genera
These genera belong to the family Malacolepadidae:
 Arcalepas Jones & Morton, 2009
 Malacolepas Hiro, 1933

References

Barnacles
Crustacean families